Vestmenn (Westmen in English) was the Old Norse word for the Gaels of Ireland and Britain, especially Ireland and Scotland. Vestmannaeyjar in Iceland and Vestmanna in the Faroe Islands take their names from it. The Norse who settled in Ireland and Scotland, known now as the "Norse–Gaels", called themselves Austmenn "Eastmen", i.e. people who had come from the East (Scandinavia).

See also
Austmenn
Norsemen
Rus

Old Norse
Gaels
Ethnonyms
Exonyms